The Sahel paradise whydah, yellow-naped whydah or northern paradise whydah (Vidua orientalis) is a small songbird.

Taxonomy
Vidua orientalis has often been considered a subspecies of eastern paradise whydah, Vidua paradisea, since both birds parasitise the green-winged pytilia, Pytilia melba, a common species of estrildid finch. However, the finch has two subspecies, nominate melba and citerior, which are sometimes treated as separate species. The ranges of these two taxa correspond well to those of V.paradisea and  V. orientalis.

Subspecies
 Vidua orientalis orientalis (from Chad to Sudan and Eritrea.) 
 Vidua orientalis kadugliensis
 Vidua orientalis  aucupum (from Senegal to northwestern Nigeria)

Distribution and habitat
Vidua orientalis is a resident breeding bird in west Africa. It lives in  open acacia savannah with scattered trees.

Description
The males in breeding plumage have black back and wings, with a rufous breast. The head is black, with a chestnut nape and a black bill. The dual-length ornamental tail feathers are black. Feet are dark grayish. When in eclipse (non-breeding) plumage, the males are similar to the hen, as they are tawny above with narrow mantle streaking. In females a dark line extends behind the eye. Juveniles are quite similar to the hens.

Biology and behavior
The Sahel paradise whydah does not build its own nests, but parasitises the green-winged pytilia, Pytilia melba, a common species of estrildid finch. These birds do not destroy the host green-winged pytilia's eggs, but they deposit their own eggs in the nests of their hosts, adding them to those already present. As in other whydah species to attract hens the songs of the males mimic the song of their hosts. These birds are not monogamous pairs, in fact males breed with many females. In a breeding season females may lay about 22 eggs, that hatch after 12–13 days of incubation. The diet of this species consists of seeds and grain.

References

Sahel paradise whydah
Birds of the Sahel
Birds of Sub-Saharan Africa
Sahel paradise whydah
Taxa named by Theodor von Heuglin